Joan Ceciel Quigley (April 10, 1927 – October 21, 2014), of San Francisco, California was an astrologer best known for her astrological advice to the Reagan White House in the 1980s. Quigley was born in Kansas City, Missouri.

She was called on by First Lady Nancy Reagan in 1981 after John Hinckley's attempted assassination of the president, and stayed on as the White House astrologer in secret until being outed in 1988 by ousted former chief of staff Donald Regan.

Relationship with Nancy Reagan
Joan Quigley first met Nancy Reagan in the 1970s on The Merv Griffin Show. After Ronald Reagan became president, and after the attempt on his life on March 30, 1981, Nancy asked Quigley if she could have foreseen, and possibly prevented, the assassination attempt. Quigley answered affirmatively, saying that she could have done so had she been looking at the time (and been part of the White House staff). After that point, Nancy Reagan enlisted Quigley's astrological advice on a regular basis, and held frequent telephone conversations with Quigley. Explaining why she turned to Quigley, Nancy later wrote, "Very few people can understand what it's like to have your husband shot at and almost die, and then have him exposed all the time to enormous crowds, tens of thousands of people, any one of whom might be a lunatic with a gun.... I was doing everything I could think of to protect my husband and keep him alive."

Joan Quigley discussed her relationship with Nancy Reagan in a book, titled What Does Joan Say?. Quigley wrote, "Not since the days of the Roman emperors, and never in the history of the United States presidency, has an astrologer played such a significant role in the nation's affairs of State."

When Donald Regan took over as chief of staff for President Reagan in 1985, he was informed by Reagan aide Michael Deaver about Quigley and her role. Regan, who frequently quarreled with Nancy Reagan, resigned in 1987 after the Iran–Contra affair. In 1988, Regan published his memoir For the Record: From Wall Street to Washington, revealing that Nancy Reagan had consulted with Quigley, and previously with astrologer Jeane Dixon. Regan wrote:

Virtually every major move and decision the Reagans made during my time as White House Chief of Staff was cleared in advance with a woman in San Francisco [Quigley] who drew up horoscopes to make certain that the planets were in a favorable alignment for the enterprise.

Ronald and Nancy Reagan denied that astrology influenced any policies or decisions. After the leak, Quigley was swarmed with media attention. Of the entire incident, Nancy Reagan said, "Nobody was hurt by it—except, possibly, me."

Death 
Quigley died after an illness on October 21, 2014.

Bibliography
 Joan Quigley, Astrology for Adults (New York: Henry Holt & Co., 1969)
 Joan Quigley, Astrology for Parents of Children & Teenagers (New York: Prentice-Hall, 1971)
 Joan Quigley, What Does Joan Say?: My Seven Years as White House Astrologer to Nancy and Ronald Reagan (New York: Carol Publishing Group, 1990)

See also
 Joyce Jillson
 Carroll Righter
 Jeane Dixon

References

Sources
 Donald Regan, For the Record: From Wall Street to Washington (New York: Harcourt, 1988)

1927 births
2014 deaths
20th-century astrologers
21st-century astrologers
American astrologers
Presidency of Ronald Reagan
Vassar College alumni
Writers from California
Writers from Kansas City, Missouri